Odlazi cirkus (trans. The Circus Is Leaving) is the second and final studio album released by former Yugoslav rock band Rani Mraz.

Recording
Like it was the case with the previous Rani Mraz album, Mojoj mami umesto maturske slike u izlogu, two official Rani Mraz members, Đorđe Balašević and Biljana Krstić, recorded Odlazi cirkus with producer Josip Boček who played all guitars, plus studio musicians in Bojan Hreljac (bass guitar), Slobodan Marković (keyboards), and Lazar Tošić (drums).

Track listing
All the songs written by Đorđe Balašević.

Personnel
Đorđe Balašević - vocals
Bilja Krstić - vocals

Additional personnel
Josip Boček - guitar
Bojan Hreljac - bass guitar
Slobodan Marković - keyboards
Lazar Tošić - drums

Legacy
The main album hits were "Mirka", "Pa dobro gde si ti", the ballads "Menuet", "Život je more", "Odlazi cirkus" and "Priča o Vasi Ladačkom", the last one going on to become one of Đorđe Balašević's signature pieces.

In 2006 "Priča o Vasi Ladačkom" was polled, by the listeners of Radio B92, #13 on the B92 Top 100 Domestic Songs list. In 2011, the song "Menuet" was polled, by the listeners of Radio 202, one of 60 greatest songs released by PGP-RTB/PGP-RTS during the sixty years of the label's activity.

References

 EX YU ROCK enciklopedija 1960-2006,  Janjatović Petar;  
Odlazi cirkus at Discogs

External links
 Odlazi cirkus at Discogs

Rani Mraz albums
1980 albums
PGP-RTB albums